Filbert Street is an east-west street on the north side of San Francisco, California. Its western end is at Lyon Street on the east edge of The Presidio and, spanning eastward, it crosses several large thoroughfares, including Van Ness Avenue and Columbus Avenue, and ends its drivable length at Kearny Street, on Telegraph Hill below Coit Tower. East of Kearny Street, it becomes a series of pedestrian step streets and walkways, with the exception of a small parking area west of Sansome Street. The most notable section of this part of Filbert Street is the Filbert Street Steps, running down the east side of Telegraph Hill. The easternmost length of Filbert Street is a walkway through Levi's Plaza ending at The Embarcadero.

The Filbert Street Steps, a step street, descend the east slope of Telegraph Hill along the line where Filbert Street would be if the hill weren't so steep. The steps run through the Grace Marchant Garden, which resident Grace Marchant started in 1949 and is now tended to and paid for by the residents of the "street." From there, the steps run down to an eastern stub of Filbert Street and the walkway through the plaza to The Embarcadero. Many houses in this residential neighborhood are accessible only from the steps. As on paved streets, several fire hydrants and a solitary parking meter are located along the steps.

The feral parrots of Telegraph Hill, which were the subject of the 2003 documentary The Wild Parrots of Telegraph Hill, may often be seen along the Filbert Street steps.

References

External links
Yelp review of the Filbert Steps
Grace Marchant Garden

Streets in San Francisco
Landmarks in San Francisco
North Beach, San Francisco
Russian Hill, San Francisco